Lejana como el viento (Distant like the wind) is a Venezuelan telenovela produced by Laura Visconti Productions and broadcast on Venevisión in 2001. The telenovela was written by Laura Visconti and stars Zair Montes and Ricardo Bianchi as the main protagonists while Henry Soto, Elluz Peraza and Arnaldo André star as the main antagonists.

Plot
Eugenia is eagerly planning her impending wedding to Edmundo, and her friends Fernando, Ramiro and Efrain are surprised at the news and her happy for her as they help in the wedding preparations. However, Eugenia's happiness will be cut short when she discovers a young woman locked up in the basement of Edmundo's home. Eugenia quickly alerts Ramiro who is a police officer about the existence of the secret woman. But Edmundo discovers about it and covers his track before the lady is discovered, and he murders Eugenia. Fernando, Ramiro and Efrain swear to get revenge for the death of their friend. After careful investigation, they eventually find the young woman who is Alejandra Santacruz who has been kept captive for 10 years. Alejandra has lot her memory and her touch with reality. The three men decide to protect her because Eugenia died while trying to save her.

Alejandra stands at the center of a deep family conspiracy. After her rescue, she is taken to the foundation run by Victoria, Fernando's mother. But what no one knows is that Edmundo has been blackmailing Victoria for years because she is responsible for killing Nicolas Santacruz, Alejandra's father. Edmundo extorted money from Victoria for the care of Alejandra, and every month, she received a picture of Alejandra. Fernando develops a close relationship with Alejandra as the young troubled woman seems to only respond to him. Efrain, a psychologist, begins Alejandra's rehabilitation, and he falls in love with her. But Alejandra has already fallen in love with Fernando, thereby forming a love triangle.

Eventually, Victoria discovers Alejandra's existence, and she plans various intrigues involving her husband Jorge who is the mastermind behind Alejandra's kidnapping. Now, the only person who can confront them is Felix de Valle, Alejandra's godfather.

Cast
 Zair Montes - Alejandra Santacruz
 Ricardo Bianchi - Fernando Bustamante
 Elluz Peraza - Victoria de Bustamante
 José Bardina - Félix del Valle
 Arnaldo André - Jorge Bustamante 
 Rafael Romero - Ramiro Malavé
 Henry Soto - Edmundo Mavares
 Esperanza Magaz - Cruz
 Raúl Xiqués - Linares
 Javier Varcárcel - Efraín Rivero
 Karina Orozco - América
 José Vieira - Marcelo
 Lourdes Martínez - Mildred
 Esther Orjuela - Zuleima
 Cristina Obín - Gladys
 José Rubens - Rufino
 Reina Hinojosa - Beatriz
 José Paniagua - Isaías
 Daniela Navarro - Mariví
 Damián Genovese - Diego
 Luciano Scorzia - Nilsson
 María Isabel Perozo - Briseida
 Karina Lescarboura - Arolkys
 Silvia Solana - Rebeca
 Saúl Martínez - Guillermo
 Roque Valero - Tony
 Marco Antonio Casanova - Javier
 Indhira Serrano - Dra. Martínez
 Carlos Omaña - Comisario Manrique
 José Mantilla - Billy
 Luis Carreño - Jairo
 Lolymar Sánchez - Iris
 Luisa Tovar - Aura Marina
 Francisco Guinot - Paco
 Gabriela Vergara - Eugenia Rangel
 Carlota Sosa - Mercedes
 Yanis Chimaras - Nicolás Santacruz
 Anabell Rivero - Tatiana

Versions
 Amor Cautivo: Mexican telenovela produced by TV Azteca starring Marimar Vega and Arap Bethke as the protagonists.

References

External links

2001 telenovelas
Venevisión telenovelas
2002 Venezuelan television series debuts
2002 Venezuelan television series endings
Venezuelan telenovelas
Spanish-language telenovelas
Television shows set in Venezuela